Greåker is a borough in the city of Sarpsborg, Norway, located 7 km west of the city centre. Before 1992 Greåker was a part of Tune municipality. It is situated at the river Glomma between Sarpsborg and Fredrikstad.

The borough of Greåker is the home of the Premier League Floorball team "Greåker Bulldogs". The team's home arena is the Tindlundhallen arena.

Greåker has been a site for diverse industry for decades, most notably in the area of paper production. The most notable remaining industry today is Nordic Paper's kraft paper mill by the Glomma river, which is the continuation of over a hundred years of various wood processing works (e.g. Greaker Cellulose, Greaker Industrier).

There is a fortress located in Greåker, built during the first decade of the 20th century. It was one of several fortresses built along the Norwegian/Swedish border during this period, in preparation for a potential war between Norway and Sweden. Norway was struggling to leave the union with Sweden, which had lasted since 1814. This war never came to happen, and the fortress was partially disabled. During World War II, the Germans attacked the fortress, coming across the river Visterflo, which unites with its source, Glomma, again at Greåker. Today the fortress is in poor condition, and used as a look-out point over Fredrikstad and the southern parts of Sarpsborg.

References

Villages in Østfold
Sarpsborg
Populated places on the Glomma River
Boroughs of Norway